The 1999 Estoril Open was a tennis tournament played on outdoor clay courts at the Estoril Court Central in the Oeiras Municipality in Portugal that was part of the International Series of the 1999 ATP Tour and of Tier IVa of the 1999 WTA Tour. The tournament was held from 5 April until 12 April 1999. Albert Costa and Katarina Srebotnik won the singles title.

WTA entrants

Seeds

Other entrants
The following players received wildcards into the singles main draw:
 Ana Catarina Nogueira
 Vanessa Menga

The following players received wildcards into the doubles main draw:
 Angela Cardoso /  Cristina Correia

The following players received entry from the singles qualifying draw:
 Anca Barna
 Laurence Courtois
 Cristina Torrens Valero
 Anna Földényi

The following players received entry as a lucky loser:
 Eva Bes Ostariz
 Lubomira Bacheva

The following player received entry from the doubles qualifying draw:
 Nirupama Vaidyanathan /  Andreea Vanc

Finals

Men's singles

 Albert Costa defeated  Todd Martin, 7–6(7–4), 2–6, 6–3
It was Costa's 1st title of the year and the 9th of his career.

Women's singles

 Katarina Srebotnik defeated  Rita Kuti-Kis, 6–3, 6–1
It was Srebotnik's 1st title of the year and the 2nd of her career.

Men's doubles

 Tomás Carbonell /  Donald Johnson defeated  Jiří Novák /  David Rikl, 6–3, 2–6, 6–1

Women's doubles

 Alicia Ortuño /  Cristina Torrens Valero defeated  Anna Földényi /  Rita Kuti-Kis, 7–6(7–4), 3–6, 6–3

External links
Official Website
ATP Tournament Profile
WTA Tournament Profile

Portugal Open
Estoril Open
Estoril Open
Estoril Open
 Estoril Open